HKS PU COLLEGE is a pre-university college in  Hassan, Karnataka, India. It is affiliated to Karnataka Pre-University Education Board. It is located near Manasa Gangotri, PM Road, Mangalore Highway, Kenchattahalli. It is situated in the outskirts of Hassan City. HKS PU COLLEGE imparting quality education in an integrated learning system where students are trained for various competitive examinations like NEET/JEE/CET/NATA etc. CREATIVE EDUCATION FOUNDATION MOODBIDRI has been associating with HKS PU COLLEGE since 2019 to bring revolutionary changes in teaching-learning process. Learning at HKS PU COLLEGE is truly student centered and career oriented which prepares the students for better future through the assistance of experienced faculties and the resource persons.

Streams offered
The College offers courses in the below mentioned science & Commerce streams
1. PCMB - Physics, Chemistry, Mathematics, Biology
2. PCMC - Physics, Chemistry, Mathematics, Computer Science
3. EBAC - Economics, Business Studies, Accountancy, Computer Science
4. EBABm - Economics, Business Studies, Accountancy, Basic mathematics

Online Registration
https://creativeedu.in/hks-admissions/

Co-curricular activities
Pre-University Education Department organised two-day State-level netball tourney at HKS PU College on October 5, 2016. More than 60 teams from various PU Colleges of Karnatka participated in that event.

References

Pre University colleges in Karnataka